36 Cancri is a star in the southern part of the zodiac constellation of Cancer, located around 501 light years away from the Sun. It has the Bayer designation c Cancri; 36 Cancri is the Flamsteed designation. This object is a visible to the naked eye as a faint, white-hued star with an apparent visual magnitude of 5.92. It is moving further from the Earth with a heliocentric radial velocity of +16 km/s.

This is an ordinary A-type main-sequence star with a stellar classification of A3 V, which indicates it is generating energy through hydrogen fusion at its core. It has a projected rotational velocity of 44 km/s, with 2.66 times the mass of the Sun and double the Sun's radius. The star is radiating 93 times the Sun's luminosity from its photosphere at an effective temperature of 8,472 K.

References

A-type main-sequence stars
Cancer (constellation)
Cancri, c
Durchmusterung objects
Cancri, 36
073143
042265
3406